Greene is a town in Androscoggin County, Maine, United States. The population was 4,376 at the 2020 census. It is included in both the Lewiston-Auburn, Maine metropolitan statistical area and the Lewiston-Auburn, Maine Metropolitan New England city and town area. The central village in the town comprises the Greene census-designated place.

History
Greene is named for Nathanael Greene. The town was incorporated in 1788. Land was given off to Lewiston in 1852 and to Webster (present day Sabattus) in 1895. The last surviving American Civil War Union Army brevet general, and general of any grade, Aaron Daggett was born in Greene in 1837.

Geography

Demographics

2010 census
As of the census of 2010, there were 4,350 people, 1,676 households, and 1,246 families living in the town. The racial makeup of the town was 97.6% White, 0.4% African American, 0.2% Native American, 0.2% Asian, 0.2% from other races, and 1.4% from two or more races. Hispanic or Latino of any race were 0.7% of the population.

There were 1,676 households, of which 33.5% had children under the age of 18 living with them, 59.4% were married couples living together, 9.7% had a female householder with no husband present, 5.3% had a male householder with no wife present, and 25.7% were non-families. 18.1% of all households were made up of individuals, and 7.2% had someone living alone who was 65 years of age or older. The average household size was 2.59 and the average family size was 2.91.

The median age in the town was 42.6 years. 22.6% of residents were under the age of 18; 6.2% were between the ages of 18 and 24; 25% were from 25 to 44; 34% were from 45 to 64; and 12.2% were 65 years of age or older. The gender makeup of the town was 50.8% male and 49.2% female.

2000 census
As of the census of 2000, there were 4,076 people, 1,494 households, and 1,186 families living in the town. The racial makeup of the town was 98.48% White, 0.47% African American, 0.10% Native American, 0.29% Asian, 0.07% from other races, and 0.59% from two or more races. Hispanic or Latino of any race were 0.71% of the population. 43% of the population are of French and French-Canadian ancestry, 15% English, 9% Irish, and 4% German.

There were 1,494 households, out of which 39.1% had children under the age of 18 living with them, 66.2% were married couples living together, 7.8% had a female householder with no husband present, and 20.6% were non-families. 15.3% of all households were made up of individuals, and 5.0% had someone living alone who was 65 years of age or older. The average household size was 2.71 and the average family size was 2.99.

In the town, the population was spread out, with 26.6% under the age of 18, 6.0% from 18 to 24, 33.2% from 25 to 44, 25.3% from 45 to 64, and 8.9% who were 65 years of age or older. The median age was 37 years. For every 100 females, there were 100.6 males. For every 100 females age 18 and over, there were 99.3 males.

The median income for a household in the town was $48,017, and the median income for a family was $52,857. Males had a median income of $33,894 versus $23,006 for females. The per capita income for the town was $19,452. About 5.0% of families and 6.5% of the population were below the poverty line, including 6.9% of those under age 18 and 5.5% of those age 65 or over.

Voter registration

Government
Greene is in Maine's 2nd congressional district, Maine Senate District 17, and Maine House of Representatives District 57.

Education
Greene is part of Maine School Administrative District #52. (MSAD 52)

Schools in the district include Turner Primary School, Turner Elementary School, Tripp Middle School, Leavitt Area High School, Greene Central School and Leeds Central School.

References

External links
Maine Genealogy: Greene, Androscoggin County, Maine
 

Towns in Androscoggin County, Maine
Towns in Maine